is a Japanese politician serving in the House of Representatives in the Diet (national legislature) as a member of the Democratic Party of Japan. A native of Matsusaka, Mie and
graduate of Georgetown University in the United States he was elected for the first time in 1996 after serving in the local assembly of Mie Prefecture.  In September 2011 he was appointed as Minister of Education, Culture, Sports, Science and Technology in the cabinet of newly appointed prime minister Yoshihiko Noda.

Notes

References

External links 
 Official website in Japanese.

Members of the House of Representatives (Japan)
Georgetown University alumni
Politicians from Mie Prefecture
People from Matsusaka, Mie
Living people
1950 births
Democratic Party of Japan politicians
Noda cabinet
Education ministers of Japan
Sports ministers of Japan
Culture ministers of Japan
Science ministers of Japan
Technology ministers of Japan
21st-century Japanese politicians